Hypangitia is a monotypic moth genus of the family Noctuidae. Its only species, Hypangitia peratopis, is found in Paraguay. Both the genus and species were first described by George Hampson in 1918.

References

Acontiinae
Monotypic moth genera